A list of American films released in 1901.

See also
 1901 in the United States

External links

1901 films at the Internet Movie Database

1901
Films
 American
1900s in American cinema